Avcılar (Turkish for 'hunters') may refer to the following places in Turkey:

 Avcılar, Istanbul, a neighborhood on the European side of the metropolis
 Avcılar, Ardanuç, a village in the District of Ardanuç, Artvin Province
 Avcılar, Borçka, a village in the District of Borçka, Artvin Province
 Avcılar, Hınıs
 Avcılar, Söke , a village in the District of Söke, Aydın Province
 Avcılar, Üzümlü
 Avcılar, Yüreğir, a village in the District of Yüreğir, Adana Province
 Avcılar, Yusufeli, a village in the District of Yusufeli, Artvin Province
 Avcılar is also an old name for Göreme in Cappadocia.